Virgil A. Pusey (1853–1897) was an American politician in the state of Washington. He served in the Washington State Senate from 1895 to 1899. In 1878, before moving West, he married Amanda Minerva Pusey (1857–1943) from his birthplace, Champaign, Illinois.

References

1853 births
1897 deaths
Republican Party Washington (state) state senators
People from Champaign, Illinois
19th-century American politicians